Emir Preldžić (born 6 September 1987) is a Bosnian-Turkish professional basketball player who last played for Orlovik Žepče of the A2 League of FBiH, third level of basketball in Bosnia and Herzegovina. He also represented the Turkish national basketball team. He is 6 ft 9 in (2.06 m) tall and he mainly plays the small forward position, but he also has the ability to play as a power forward, shooting guard and point guard.

Professional career

Early years
Preldžić began his career playing with Čelik Zenica youth teams in Bosnia and Herzegovina. He made his pro debut with Čelik Zenica in the Bosnia and Herzegovina League during the 2003–04 season. In the 2004–05 season he played with Triglav Kranj. He then moved to the Adriatic League club Geoplin Slovan for the 2005–06 season.

Fenerbahçe Ülker
In 2007, he signed a four-year contract with the Turkish EuroLeague team Fenerbahçe Ülker.

On 27 January 2011, in the EuroLeague match against Power Electronics Valencia, he double blocked Rafa Martínez in only one second. He played with 10 points, 2 rebounds, 5 assists and 2 blocks performance in a victory against Power Electronics Valencia.

On 13 February 2011, in Turkish Cup final match against Beşiktaş Cola Turka, he played with 35 points, 3 rebounds and 4 assists as MVP performance.

On 28 February 2011, the official page of the team declared that he had signed a three-year contract with the team.

On 20 March 2011, he played with 10 points, 15 rebounds and 10 assist performance against Olin Edirne which he did his first triple double in the team. This triple double is second in Turkish Basketball League history after Mark Dickel played with 16 points, 13 rebounds and 11 assists performance against Galatasaray in the 2002-03 season.

On 11 October 2012, his stat line was 20 points, 4 rebounds, 4 assists and 2 steals in a performance against BC Khimki in 2012–13 Euroleague first week match which made him Euroleague Weekly MVP by 31 ratings.

Darüşşafaka
On August 25, 2015, Preldžić signed with Darüşşafaka.

Galatasaray
On September 9, 2016, Preldžić signed a two-year deal with Galatasaray.

NBA rights
In the 2009 NBA draft, Preldžić was selected by the Phoenix Suns in the second round, with the 57th draft pick. His draft rights were then traded to the Cleveland Cavaliers, and later to the Washington Wizards in a February 2010 trade that sent Antawn Jamison from Washington to Cleveland. On July 17, 2014, the Dallas Mavericks acquired Preldžić's rights from the Wizards in a sign-and-trade deal for DeJuan Blair. On July 6, 2016, the rights to Preldžić, along with Jeremy Evans, were traded to the Indiana Pacers in exchange for the rights to Stanko Barać. On July 14, 2017, the rights to Preldžić were traded to the Toronto Raptors in exchange for Cory Joseph. On February 6, 2019, his rights were again traded, this time to the Philadelphia 76ers. On March 25, 2021, his rights were traded to the New York Knicks.

Career statistics

Euroleague

|-
| style="text-align:left;"| 2007–08
| style="text-align:left;" rowspan=8| Fenerbahçe
| 20 || 10 || 18.1 || .376 || .255 || .500 || 2.3 || 1.1 || .5 || .1 || 4.8 || 3.5
|-
| style="text-align:left;"| 2008–09
| 16 || 7 || 22.6 || .358 || .245 || .806 || 3.8 || 2.5 || 1.1 || .3 || 7.3 || 7.4
|-
| style="text-align:left;"| 2009–10
| 10 || 1 || 25.2 || .362 || .188 || .667 || 4.1 || 2.3 || .9 || .1 || 6.8 || 7.7
|-
| style="text-align:left;"| 2010–11
| 16 || 1 || 16.3 || .494 || .438 || .679 || 2.4 || 2.3 || .3 || .3 || 7.3 || 8.1
|-
| style="text-align:left;"| 2011–12
| 16 || 4 || 21.5 || .310 || .250 || .750 || 3.3 || 3.1 || .6 || .1 || 6.7 || 7.5
|-
| style="text-align:left;"| 2012–13
| 22 || 4 || 22.5 || .504 || .333 || .704 || 2.1 || 3.5 || .6 || .1 || 8.1 || 10.5
|-
| style="text-align:left;"| 2013–14
| 23 || 18 || 29.0 || .452 || .317 || .696 || 4.7 || 4.7 || 1.1 || .3 || 10.2 || 15.5
|-
| style="text-align:left;"| 2014–15
| 29 || 7 || 22.0 || .447 || .345 || .742 || 2.7 || 3.1 || .9 || .1 || 5.8 || 8.2
|-
| style="text-align:left;"| 2015–16
| style="text-align:left;"| Darüşşafaka
| 20 || 5 || 18.1 || .345 || .273 || .579 || 3.4 || 2.9 || .5 || .2 || 4.6 || 7.5
|-
| style="text-align:left;"| 2016–17
| style="text-align:left;"| Galatasaray
| 18 || 3 || 16.5 || .395 || .385 || .684 || 2.4 || 2.3 || 1.0 || .0 || 5.1 || 7.9
|- class="sortbottom"
| style="text-align:left;"| Career
| style="text-align:left;"|
| 152 || 57 || 21.7 || .413 || .294 || .690 || 3.1 || 2.9 || .7 || .2 || 6.8 || 8.6

National team career

Slovenian national team
Preldžić was a member of the Slovenian national basketball team and he competed for Slovenia at the 2008 Olympic Qualifying Tournament, since he acquired Slovenian citizenship as a member of the Bosniak community in Slovenia.

Turkish national team
Through 2011, the Bosnian media speculated that Preldžić may play for the Bosnian national basketball team because of his birthplace Zenica, city in modern Bosnia and Herzegovina. However, on July 6, 2011, the Turkish Basketball Federation announced Preldžić's name in its official nominated squad for the EuroBasket 2011 held in Lithuania. Preldžić decided to change national team using the FIBA regulation on Eligibility and National Status of Players (Chapter I.22).

He was later selected to the Turkish national team's EuroBasket 2011 roster by head coach Orhun Ene. On 5 September 2011 in EuroBasket 2011 group match against Spain, he played with 18 points, 5 rebounds and 1 steal performance in a victory. Over the tournament, he averaged 10.8 points, 3.4 rebounds and 2.3 assists per game.

He was once again called to play for the national team at the EuroBasket 2013 in Slovenia. He averaged 8.8 points, and 3.8 rebounds and assists over 5 tournament games.

References

External links

Emir Preldžić at draftexpress.com
Emir Preldžić at eurobasket.com
Emir Preldžić at euroleague.net
Emir Preldžić at nba.com
Emir Preldžić at tblstat.net

1987 births
Living people
Bosniaks of Bosnia and Herzegovina
Bosnia and Herzegovina men's basketball players
Bosnia and Herzegovina emigrants to Turkey
Bosnia and Herzegovina emigrants to Slovenia
Darüşşafaka Basketbol players
Fenerbahçe men's basketball players
KD Slovan players
Galatasaray S.K. (men's basketball) players
Naturalized citizens of Turkey
Sportspeople from Zenica
Phoenix Suns draft picks
Power forwards (basketball)
Slovenian men's basketball players
Slovenian people of Bosnia and Herzegovina descent
Slovenian people of Bosniak descent
Small forwards
Turkish men's basketball players
Turkish people of Bosnia and Herzegovina descent
2014 FIBA Basketball World Cup players
Bahçeşehir Koleji S.K. players